The Medical Arts Building and Garage, also known as the Hickman Building, is a historic building in Memphis, Tennessee, U.S.. It was built in 1925–1926. Upon its completion, most of its tenant were members of medical professions like physicians and dentists. There were also medical laboratories. The building was acquired by Francis Gould Hickman, the editor of the Cotton Trade Journal, in the 1950s.

The building was designed by Tietig & Lee in the Gothic Revival architectural style. It has been listed on the National Register of Historic Places since August 16, 1984.

References

National Register of Historic Places in Shelby County, Tennessee
Gothic Revival architecture in Tennessee
Buildings and structures completed in 1925